Desisa luzonica is a species of beetle in the family Cerambycidae. It was described by Stephan von Breuning in 1938. It is known from Thailand, Borneo and the Philippines.

References

Desisa
Beetles described in 1938